Brigadier General Francis Aylmer Maxwell,  (7 September 1871 – 21 September 1917) was a British Army officer in the Second Boer War and First World War. He was also a recipient of the Victoria Cross (VC), the highest award for gallantry in the face of the enemy that can be awarded to British and Commonwealth forces.

Early life and military career

He was born on 7 September 1871 at "Westhill" in the Grange, Guildford in Surrey, the son of Surgeon Major Thomas Maxwell.

Maxwell was commissioned a second lieutenant in the Sussex Regiment on 7 November 1891 and promoted to lieutenant on 24 November 1893. He transferred to the Indian Staff Corps, Indian Army, and took part in the Chitral Expedition in 1895 with the Queen's Own Corps of Guides. In the following years he served on the North-West Frontier of India, and took part in the Tirah Campaign 1897-98 under Sir William Lockhart, to whom he was Aide-de-camp. He was appointed a Companion of the Distinguished Service Order (DSO) for his services.

Second Boer War
Maxwell was attached to Roberts's Light Horse during the Second Boer War 1899-1900. By early March 1900 the British had captured the two capital cities of the Boer republics, and the war entered a new phase with a Boer guerrilla campaign to hit the British supply and communication lines.

Victoria Cross

Maxwell was 28 years old, and a lieutenant attached to Roberts's Light Horse during the Second Boer War when the following deed took place for which he was awarded the VC:

On 31 March 1900 at Sanna's Post (aka Korn Spruit), South Africa, 

Major Edmund Phipps-Hornby, Sergeant Charles Parker, Gunner Isaac Lodge and Driver Horace Glasock also earned the Victoria Cross in this action.

Later service in South Africa
Maxwell was promoted to captain on 10 July 1901. He was appointed Aide-de-camp to Lord Kitchener, Commander-in-Chief of the Forces in South Africa. Following the end of hostilities in early June 1902, he left Cape Town on board the SS Orotava together with Lord Kitchener, and arrived at Southampton the next month. He received a brevet promotion to major on 22 August 1902.

India
When Kitchener went to India as commander-in-chief in November 1902, Maxwell joined him there as his Aide-de-Camp.

First World War

In the Great War, he commanded the 12th Battalion of the Middlesex Regiment from June to October 1916, and in November 1916, was awarded a Bar to his DSO. For his actions taking Thiepval, he was given command of the 18th King George's Own Lancers, Indian Army in October 1916.

As commander of the 12th Middlesex, and later of the 27th Brigade of the 9th (Scottish) Division, Maxwell came to be regarded as one of the finest combat commanders serving in the British Army on the Western Front. He was an aggressive commander who was also both an original thinker and popular with his men.

Despite his rank, Maxwell was frequently at the front line. He was killed in action, shot by a German sniper, during the Battle of the Menin Road Ridge on 21 September 1917. He is buried in Ypres Reservoir Commonwealth War Graves Commission Cemetery. The gravestone inscription states: "An ideal soldier and a very perfect gentleman beloved by all his men."

His brother, Lieutenant Colonel Eustace Lockhart Maxwell of the 11th King Edward's Own Lancers (Probyn's Horse), was killed on 20 July 1916 during the Battle of the Somme, whilst commanding the 23rd Manchester Regiment. He is commemorated on the Neuve-Chapelle Indian Memorial.

General Maxwell is commemorated with a plaque in St. Giles Cathedral on the Royal Mile in Edinburgh, Scotland. Maxwell's medals are now held in the Imperial War Museum as part of the "Lord Ashcroft collection" having been bought at auction for £78,000.  His wife, Charlotte Maxwell, published a volume of his edited letters in 1921.

References

External links

1871 births
1917 deaths
British military personnel of the Chitral Expedition
British military personnel of the Tirah campaign
British military personnel killed in World War I
Second Boer War recipients of the Victoria Cross
British recipients of the Victoria Cross
Indian Army generals of World War I
Companions of the Order of the Star of India
Royal Sussex Regiment officers
People from Guildford
Indian Staff Corps officers
Companions of the Distinguished Service Order
People educated at United Services College
Deaths by firearm in Belgium
British Indian Army generals
Military personnel from Guildford